Michał Jan Henryk Giedroyc (25 January 1929 – 29 December 2017) was a Polish-Lithuanian aristocrat who later became a naturalised British citizen and aircraft designer.

Giedroyc was born on 25 January 1929 in Łobzów, Poland (today Labzova in Belarus). His father Tadeusz was a politician, since 1938 Polish senator. His mother was Anna Dunin-Szostakowska. In 1940 he and most of the family were deported to a Siberian Gulag by the Soviet NKVD after the Soviet invasion of Poland. They escaped to Iran in 1942 and travelled to Britain in 1947. He studied at the University of London and then worked designing aircraft at Vickers Aerospace. He later moved into economic consultancy. He became an expert in the history of medieval Lithuania. His memoirs were published in 2010 as Crater's Edge.

His daughters include comedian and television presenter Mel Giedroyc and director Coky Giedroyc.

See also
 Giedroyć

References

1929 births
2017 deaths
Deaths from pulmonary embolism
Polish emigrants to the United Kingdom
Lithuanian emigrants to the United Kingdom
Polish nobility
20th-century Lithuanian nobility
21st-century Lithuanian nobility
Aircraft designers
Historians of Lithuania
British memoirists
Naturalised citizens of the United Kingdom
Michal
Gulag detainees
Vickers people